Cayo Agua (Water Cay) is the eastern and southernmost island in the Bocas del Toro Archipelago, Panama, separating Chiriquí Lagoon in the south from the Caribbean Sea in the north. It has a surface area of 16 km2.

See also
 List of islands of Panama

References

Caribbean islands of Panama